Geoffrey Nigel Laurence Rushton (16 February 1962 – 13 November 2004), better known under the pseudonyms John Balance or the later variation Jhonn Balance, was an English musician, occultist, artist and poet.

He was best known as a co-founder of the experimental music group Coil, in collaboration with his partner Peter "Sleazy" Christopherson. Coil was active from 1982 to Balance's death in 2004. He was responsible for the majority of Coil's vocals, lyrics and chants, along with synthesizers and various other instruments both commonplace and esoteric.

Outside Coil he collaborated with Cultural Amnesia (at the beginning of the 1980s), Nurse with Wound, Death in June, Psychic TV, Current 93, Chris & Cosey, Thighpaulsandra, and produced several Nine Inch Nails remixes.

Early life and career
Balance was born Geoffrey Laurence Burton. He took the surname 'Rushton' from his stepfather. During his teens, Balance became acquainted with Christopherson as a fan of the latter's group Throbbing Gristle. The duo were both members of Psychic TV, Christopherson's next project after Throbbing Gristle. They eventually quit Psychic TV to form Coil.

Balance was extremely active as a youth and in his early twenties. Apart from his early musical releases and involvement in bands before Coil, he published seven issues of a fanzine, Stabmental, and was a tireless correspondent with members of the alternative musical and cultural scene in the UK and also abroad. He also released three compilation albums of music by bands and artists about which he was enthusiastic: Endzeit, Bethel and The Men with the Deadly Dreams. The compilations are today collector's items and fetch high prices. Also from his youth, Balance was an avid occultist, maintaining a lifelong interest in the likes of Aleister Crowley and Austin Osman Spare.

Death
On 13 November 2004, during a period of heavy drinking, Balance fell from a two-storey balcony at his home and died that evening in the hospital. Peter Christopherson announced Balance's death on the Threshold House website, and provided details surrounding the accident. Balance's memorial service was held near Bristol on 23 November, and was attended by approximately 100 people. November 2014 saw the publication of a retrospective volume of his art called "Bright Lights and Cats with no Mouths" by Edition Timeless.

Discography
Balance first recorded using the alias "Murderwerkers". The Murderwerkers track, "Blue Funk (Scars for E)", was included on the Sterile Records cassette compilation Standard Response. Balance also published an underground zine, Stabmental, and released a track, "A Thin Veil of Blood", also using the nom de guerre Stabmental. "A Thin Veil of Blood" was included on the cassette compilation Deleted Funtime – Various Tunes for Various Loons. Balance then joined up with Peter Christopherson and Boyd Rice to record Nightmare Culture under the moniker "The Sickness of Snakes". Balance subsequently joined Psychic TV and performed alongside Christopherson; however in 1984, Balance and Christopherson left the group to develop Coil.  A short collaboration with Zos Kia produced the split tape Transparent.  Credit for the album was shared, and marked Coil's first release. The original Coil / Zos Kia tape, Transparent, was released as a "His-Storical" CD reissue in 1997.

During Coil's 23-year career, Balance collaborated with a number of his peers, including Jim Thirlwell/Clint Ruin (Foetus), Marc Almond, Thighpaulsandra, NON, Current 93, and CoH; appearing on many of these artists' albums.

With Psychic TV
Dreams Less Sweet
Just Drifting
Berlin Atonal Vol. 2
N.Y. Scum
Mein-Goett-In-Gen

With Coil

Other groups
Murderwerkers: "Blue Funk (Scars for E)" on Sterile Records compilation Standard Response. (1979)
Stabmental: "A Thin Veil of Blood" on compilation Deleted Funtime - Various Tunes for Various Loons. (1980)
Sickness of Snakes: Nightmare Culture (1985)
Rosa Mundi: "The Snow Man" on compilations The Final Solstice, The Final Solstice II and split album Grief. (1999)

Other contributions

References

1962 births
2004 deaths
Accidental deaths from falls
Accidental deaths in England
Alcohol-related deaths in England
Chaos magicians
Chapman Stick players
Coil (band) members
English experimental musicians
English industrial musicians
English modern pagans
English male songwriters
English gay musicians
People from Mansfield
20th-century English male singers
English LGBT singers
English LGBT songwriters
Gay singers
Gay songwriters
Cassette culture 1970s–1990s
British noise musicians
20th-century English LGBT people
21st-century English LGBT people
Rosa Mundi (group) members